This is a list of operas by the Czech composer Bedřich Smetana (1824–1884). All premieres took place in Prague.

List

References
Notes

Sources
Tyrrell, John (1992), 'Smetana, Bedřich' in The New Grove Dictionary of Opera, ed. Stanley Sadie (London) 

 
Lists of operas by composer
Lists of compositions by composer